Take One  is an album by the American musician T. S. Monk. It was released on the Blue Note label in 1992. Monk supported the album with a European tour.

Production
The album was produced by Don Sickler and Thelonious Monk Jr.

Reception

The Ottawa Citizen deemed the album "a straightforward hard bop collection with compositions that come mostly from the mid-50s." The Indianapolis Star wrote that, "though the arrangements are based on originals recorded by his father's generation, this doesn't seem like a ghost-band venture."

The AllMusic review by Scott Yanow stated: "Drummer T.S. Monk's debut as a leader in jazz found him discarding his earlier R&B-ish music in favor of heading an impressive hard bop revival group ... The T.S. Monk Sextet was just beginning its long life with this recording; all of its CDs are highly recommended to hard bop fans".

Track listing
 "Monaco" (Kenny Dorham) – 6:34
 "Skippy" (Thelonious Monk) – 3:40
 "Infra-Rae" (Hank Mobley) – 6:07
 "Waiting" (Idrees Sulieman) – 5:43
 "Boa" (Elmo Hope) – 4:49
 "Round Midnight" (Thelonious Monk) – 7:28
 "Jodi" (Walter Davis Jr.) – 4:34
 "Bear Cat" (Clifford Jordan) – 3:54
 "Capetown Ambush" (Donald Brown) – 5:35
 "Shoutin'" (Tommy Turrentine) – 6:14
 "Minor's Holiday" (Dorham) – 5:22
 "Think of One" (Thelonious Monk) – 6:39

Personnel
T. S. Monk – drums 
Don Sickler – trumpet
Bobby Porcelli – alto saxophone
Willie Williams – tenor saxophone 
Ronnie Mathews – piano 
James Genus – bass

References

T. S. Monk albums
1992 albums
Blue Note Records albums
Albums recorded at Van Gelder Studio